Kalateh may refer to:

Golestan Province
Sarkhon Kalateh, a city in Golestan Province, Iran

Ilam Province
Kalateh, Ilam, a village in Shirvan and Chardaval County

Kurdistan Province
Kalateh, Kamyaran, a village in Kamyaran County
Kalateh, Sanandaj, a village in Sanandaj County

North Khorasan Province
Kalateh-ye Reza, a village in North Khorasan Province, Iran

Razavi Khorasan Province
Kalateh-ye Reza Khan, a village in Razavi Khorasan Province, Iran
Kalateh-ye Mazinan, a village in Razavi Khorasan Province, Iran
Kalateh-ye Tir Kaman, a village in Razavi Khorasan Province, Iran

Semnan Province
Kalateh Khij, a city in Semnan Province, Iran
Kalateh Rudbar, a city in Semnan Province, Iran

South Khorasan Province
Kalateh-ye Now Salmanabad, a village in South Khorasan Province, Iran
Kalateh-ye Ryisi, a village in South Khorasan Province, Iran
Kalateh-ye Rezaqoli, a village in Tabas County

See also

Kalati, Iran (disambiguation)